Mariner is a surname. Notable people with the name include:
 Edward Mariner (1877–1949), English cricketer
 Paul Mariner (1953–2021), English football coach and retired player
 Rosemary Bryant Mariner (born 1953), United States Naval Aviator
 Sandra Mariner (born 1974), Austrian track luger
 Wendy Mariner, a Professor of Health Law, Bioethics & Human Rights at Boston University School of Public Health
 William Mariner (VC) (1882–1916), English soldier awarded the Victoria Cross during the First World War
 William Mariner (writer) (1791–1853), Englishman who wrote about the Polynesian island kingdom of Tonga

See also
Mariner (disambiguation)
Marriner